Michael Chang was the defending champion but lost in the final 6–4, 3–6, 6–4 against Pete Sampras.

Seeds
A champion seed is indicated in bold text while text in italics indicates the round in which that seed was eliminated.

  Pete Sampras (champion)
  Michael Chang (final)
  Mark Woodforde (second round)
  Richard Krajicek (quarterfinals)
  Jan Siemerink (semifinals)
  Todd Woodbridge (semifinals)
  Brett Steven (first round)
  David Prinosil (quarterfinals)

Draw

References
 1996 Salem Open Draw

Hong Kong Open (tennis)
Singles